Awal Khan (born February 1, 1974 in Lahore) is a Pakistani-born cricketer who played for the Oman national cricket team. He is a right-hand batsman and right arm medium-fast bowler. He played for Oman in the 2005 ICC Trophy and the 2007 ICC World Cricket League Division Two.

External links
 
 

1974 births
Cricketers from Lahore
Living people
Omani cricketers
Pakistani emigrants to Oman
Pakistani expatriates in Oman